Arnold Wientjes (17 June 1938 – 7 April 1999) was a Dutch rower. He competed in the men's coxed pair event at the 1960 Summer Olympics.

References

1938 births
1999 deaths
Dutch male rowers
Olympic rowers of the Netherlands
Rowers at the 1960 Summer Olympics
Sportspeople from The Hague